Naoani Vare (born 28 May 1998) is a Papua New Guinean cricketer. In July 2018, she was named in Papua New Guinea's squad for the 2018 ICC Women's World Twenty20 Qualifier tournament. She made her Women's Twenty20 International (WT20I) for Papua New Guinea against the United Arab Emirates in the World Twenty20 Qualifier on 8 July 2018.

In April 2019, she was named in Papua New Guinea's squad for the 2019 ICC Women's Qualifier EAP tournament in Vanuatu. In August 2019, she was named in Papua New Guinea's squad for the 2019 ICC Women's World Twenty20 Qualifier tournament in Scotland. In October 2021, she was named in Papua New Guinea's team for the 2021 Women's Cricket World Cup Qualifier tournament in Zimbabwe.

References

External links
 

1998 births
Living people
Papua New Guinean women cricketers
Papua New Guinea women Twenty20 International cricketers
Place of birth missing (living people)